Harold Caskey (January 3, 1938 – October 1, 2015) was an American politician who served in the Missouri Senate from the 31st district from 1977 to 2005.

He died of Parkinson's disease on October 1, 2015, in Merriam, Kansas at age 77.

References

1938 births
2015 deaths
Democratic Party Missouri state senators